Shayle Robert Searle PhD (26 April 1928 – 18 February 2013) was a New Zealand mathematician who was Professor Emeritus of Biological Statistics at Cornell University. He was a leader in the field of linear and mixed models in statistics, and published widely on the topics of linear models, mixed models, and variance component estimation.

Searle was one of the first statisticians to use matrix algebra in statistical methodology, and was an early proponent of the use of applied statistical techniques in animal breeding.

He died at his home in Ithaca, New York.

Education
 BA – Victoria University of Wellington – 1949
 MSc – Victoria University of Wellington – 1950
 PhD – Cornell University – 1958
 DSc (h.c.) – Victoria University of Wellington – 2005

Employment
 Research Statistician – New Zealand Dairy Board – 1953 to 1955, 1959 to 1962
 Statistician – University Computing Center, Cornell University – 1962 to 1965
 Professor of Biological Statistics – Cornell University – 1965 to 1996

Honours
Winner, Humboldt Research Award of the Alexander von Humboldt Foundation
Fellow, American Statistical Association
Fellow, Royal Statistical Society
Honorary Fellow, Royal Society of New Zealand

Bibliography

Books

Selected journal articles

2000s

1990s

1980s

1970s

1960s

1950s

References

Further reading

External links

Cornell University alumni
Cornell University faculty
Victoria University of Wellington alumni
New Zealand mathematicians
New Zealand statisticians
Biostatisticians
1928 births
2013 deaths
Fellows of the American Statistical Association
Writers from Ithaca, New York